The 1948 National Challenge Cup was the 35th edition of the United States open soccer championship. The tournament had many delays due to weather in the eastern division and by the time Brookhattan had won the eastern final it had to put off playing the national final to entertain touring Liverpool F.C. The championship game was further put off when a number of Simpkins players had US Olympic commitments. When the final was played it took place on October 17 at St. Louis where the Simpkins defeated Brookhattan 32.

Eastern Division

Western Division

Final

See also
1948 National Amateur Cup

U.S. Open Cup
U.S.